Looking for Rachel Wallace is the sixth Spenser novel by Robert B. Parker, first published in 1980.

Plot summary
Spenser is hired to protect a lesbian, feminist activist, the eponymous Rachel Wallace.  Spenser defends her more vigorously than she would like and she fires him.  Shortly afterwards, she is kidnapped and the police have almost nothing to go on.  Though no longer officially employed to protect her, Spenser feels duty-bound to find her because he could have protected her if he had followed her orders and held onto the job.

His investigation leads him to an organization that is fiercely anti-communist, anti-gay, and loosely affiliated with the local Ku Klux Klan.  Spenser gets free rein to operate because the police know that he can be more persuasive than they can in finding Rachel.  A snowstorm paralyzes Boston and Spenser has to go on foot if he wants to get to Rachel Wallace before they kill her.

Characters
Spenser: Boston private investigator
Rachel Wallace
Susan Silverman
Julie Wells (Rachel Wallace's lover)
Lawrence English
Martin Quirk
Frank Belson 
Mingo Mulready

1980 American novels
Spenser (novel series)
American detective novels
Novels about kidnapping